Robert Marmion or Robert Marmyon is the name of:

Robert Marmion (died 1144)
Robert Marmion, 2nd Baron Marmion of Tamworth (died before 1181), see Baron Marmion
Robert Marmion, 3rd Baron Marmion of Tamworth (died 1218), Chief Judiciary of England. Sheriff of Worcestershire.
Robert Marmion, 4th Baron Marmion of Tamworth (Robert Marmion the Elder, died 1241), son of the 3rd Baron Marmion of Tamworth
Robert Marmion (died 1242) (Robert Marmion the Younger, died 1242), son of the 3rd Baron Marmion of Tamworth, rebel in the Second Barons' War
Robert Marmion, 5th Baron Marmion of Winteringham (died 1360), see Baron Marmion

See also 
Marmion (disambiguation)